The Earsdon Sword Dance is a traditional English folk dance performed by the Royal Earsdon Sword Dancers. As the name suggests, they are based in Earsdon, Northumberland, England, a village which is surrounded by other villages including East Holwell, West Holywell and Backworth, while the resort town of Whitley Bay itself is only 3 miles (2 km) away.

The Earsdon dance company is one of the oldest sword dance teams in the country with a history dating back to before the 17th century. Since 1829 they have traditionally performed each Christmas for the Dukes of Northumberland at Alnwick Castle. The persons in the team are a Tommy (or Captain) and Bessy (a man dressed as a female) character, five dancers, and a musician who plays the fiddle. The seven performers wear a bright costume whilst the fiddler may wear his normal clothes.

The swords used are two handled swords, the flexible blades of which are  approximately twenty-four inches (609 mm) in length and one and one eighth inches (29 mm) in width.

See also
 Tommy and Betty
 Geordie dialect words

References

External links
Earsdon Sword Dance

Northumbrian folklore
Morris dance